Denai Moore is a British-Jamaican artist and singer. Her most recent album Modern Dread was released in July 2020. Moore's musical style is a mix of soul, folk, electronic, and other styles, and she has said she takes influence from Lauryn Hill and Bon Iver. She refers to her own music as "genre free". She has been described as "one to watch out for" by The Fader.

Early life and career 
Moore was born in Spanish Town, Jamaica, where she learned to play keyboards from her father. Her family moved to Stratford, London when she was 10. After she left school, she played in small clubs in East London, and appeared as a guest vocalist on SBTRKT's 2014 album Wonder Where We Land. She later signed with Because Music.

Moore's first single, "The Lake", was produced by Plan B. Her album Elsewhere was released in 2015 and produced by Rodaidh McDonald (The xx, Savages). Her second album We Used To Bloom was released in 2017. Modern Dread was released in 2020; in a review of the album The Guardian noted that "Moore’s hypnotically sinister beats take the listener on a surrealist journey into a fantasy world."

References

Living people
Year of birth missing (living people)
People from Spanish Town
Jamaican singer-songwriters
Jamaican guitarists
Jamaican emigrants to the United Kingdom
21st-century Black British women singers
Because Music artists